In gridiron football, a turnover occurs when the team with the ball loses possession of the ball without kicking it, which is then gained by the other team. In American football, the two events that are officially classified as "turnovers" are fumbles (accidental loss of a live ball after a player has possession) and interceptions (passes intended for a member of the passing team, but caught by a member of the defending team).

In addition, the term "turnover" is often used to refer to a turnover on downs, when a team attempts to gain a first down, touchdown or field goal on a fourth down play (known as a fourth down conversion), but is unsuccessful. When this occurs, the opposing team automatically gains possession at the spot to which the ball was advanced at the end of the play, unless a penalty has occurred (every defensive penalty, if accepted, results either in an automatic first down or a replay of down). In this event, the team that has lost possession is not permitted an opportunity to advance the ball any further.

NFL Football
National Football League game statistics recording turnovers only include lost fumbles and intercepted passes; turnovers on downs are not included (e.g., a team whose only turnovers are turnovers on downs is credited with having "no turnovers").

Canadian Football
In Canadian football, turnovers generally occur in a similar manner to American football, except that a turnover on downs will occur after three downs instead of four. In addition, Canadian Football League statistics record turnovers on downs on an equal basis to turnovers caused by fumbles and interceptions.

References

American football terminology